This article provides information on Santa Ana Unified School District elementary schools.

Adams Elementary School
Adams Elementary School is named after John Adams, the second President of the United States.
Adams Elementary School Webpage

Carver Elementary School
Carver Elementary School is named after George Washington Carver.
Carver Elementary School Webpage

Davis Elementary School
Davis Elementary School is named after Wallace Ray Davis.
Davis Elementary School Webpage

Diamond Elementary School
Diamond Elementary School .
Diamond Elementary School Webpage

Edison Elementary School
Edison Elementary School Webpage

Esqueda Elementary School
Esqueda Elementary School is named after Manuel Esqueda, a Santa Ana philanthropist.
 Esqueda Elementary School Webpage

Franklin Elementary School
Franklin Elementary School Webpage

Fremont Elementary School
Fremont Elementary School is a large elementary school with an enrollment of 810 students in Kindergarten through 5th Grade. 
 Fremont Elementary School Webpage

Garfield Elementary School
Garfield Elementary School is an elementary school that offers Pre-K through fifth grade. Garfield is named after the 20th President of the United States, James A. Garfield. The school principal of this school is Nancy-Diaz Miller. Garfield Elementary School is the proud Home of the Gators. 
Garfield Elementary School Webpage

Grant Elementary School
Grant Elementary School Webpage

Greenville Fundamental School
Greenville Fundamental School Webpage

Harvey Elementary School
Harvey Elementary School Webpage

Heninger Elementary School
Heninger Elementary School Webpage

Hoover Elementary School
Hoover Elementary School Webpage

Jackson Elementary School
Jackson elementary is named after the seventh president, Andrew Jackson
Jackson Elementary School Webpage

Jefferson Elementary School
Jefferson Elementary School was named after third president of the United States, Thomas Jefferson.

Jefferson Elementary School Webpage

Kennedy Elementary School
Jefferson Elementary School was named after third president of the United States, Thomas Jefferson.

Kennedy Elementary School Webpage

King Elementary School
King Elementary School Webpage

Lincoln Elementary School
Lincoln Elementary School Webpage

Lowell Elementary School
Lowell Elementary School Webpage

Madison Elementary School
Madison Elementary School Webpage

Martin Elementary School 
Martin Elementary School is named after aviation pioneer Glenn Luther Martin.
Martin Elementary School Webpage

Monroe Elementary School
Monroe Elementary School Webpage

Monte Vista Elementary School
Monte Vista Elementary School Webpage

Muir Fundamental School
Muir Fundamental was a 2011 Blue Ribbon Award winner.
Muir Elementary School Webpage

Pío Pico Elementary School
Pío Pico Elementary School

Remington Elementary School
Remington Elementary School Webpage

Romero-Cruz Elementary School
Romero-Cruz Elementary School is named after Santa Ana teacher Lydia Romero-Cruz.
Romero-Cruz Elementary School Webpage

Roosevelt Elementary School
Roosevelt Elementary School Webpage

Santiago Elementary School
Santiago Elementary School Webpage

Sepulveda Elementary School
Sepulveda Elementary School Webpage

Taft Elementary School
Taft Elementary School Webpage

Thorpe Fundamental School
Thorpe was a 2011 Blue Ribbon Award winner.
Thorpe Fundamental School Webpage

Walker Elementary School
Walker Elementary School Webpage

Washington Elementary School
Washington Elementary School Webpage

Wilson Elementary School
Wilson Elementary School is in Richmond, California. In 2020, there was a county vote to rename it Michelle Obama Elementary School, with a new school building expected before the 2021 school year with the new name.

Wilson Elementary School Webpage

References

External links
SAUSD Webpage
SAUSD Elementary School Webpage

Education in Santa Ana, California